Elections to Torbay Council took place on Thursday 5 May 2011. All 36 seats on the council were up for election. The previous election also produced a majority for the Conservative Party.

Ward results

See also 
 2011 Torbay mayoral election

References

 

2011 English local elections
2011
2010s in Devon